Nikolay Davydenko was the defender of championship title; however, he lost to Andrey Golubev in the third round.
Unseeded Golubev, the biggest surprise of this tournament, won in the final 6–3, 7–5, against Jürgen Melzer.

Seeds
All seeds receive a bye into the second round.

Draw

Finals

Top half

Section 1

Section 2

Bottom half

Section 3

Section 4

Qualifying

Seeds

Qualifiers

Lucky losers

Draw

First qualifier

Second qualifier

Third qualifier

Fourth qualifier

Fifth qualifier

Sixth qualifier

References
Main Draw
Qualifying Singles

Singles